Chow Kwai Lam (26 August 1942 – 16 July 2018) was a Malaysian football player and coach.

Playing career 
Chow played for Negeri Sembilan FA and Selangor FA in his playing career, winning 3 Malaysia Cups with Selangor, and runners-up in the inaugural 1967 Asian Club Championship also with Selangor, losing to Israel's Hapoel Tel Aviv in the final. He represented Malaysia from 1965 to 1971, being made captain of the 1965 Merdeka Tournament squad, before becoming the national team head coach in 1978.

Coaching career 
After the 1978 Malaysia coaching stint, Chow coached his former team Selangor FA from 1979 to 1983, before moving to coach Sarawak FA in 1984. He coached Kuala Lumpur FA in 1989, 1992, 1995, and 1996. In between his Kuala Lumpur stint, he also coached the Malaysia U-23 squad in their unsuccessful mission to qualify for the 1992 Olympic Games in Barcelona. He briefly coached Perak FA in 1999, before coaching in Singapore, first for Tampines Rovers in 2002 until 2003. He later coached Paya Lebar Punggol from December 2004 to June 2005, during which time he was accused of attempted bribery and fined RM114,000, at a court sentence in 2007. He maintains his innocence, as per reported in an interview with Malaysian newspaper Malay Mail in 2014. Until his death, this is the last known club Chow has coached in his career.

He won 6 more Malaysia Cups as coach (3 with Selangor and 3 in a row with Kuala Lumpur) in addition of 1 Charity Shield and 1 League championship, both also with Kuala Lumpur. He also won the 2002 Singapore Cup with Tampines Rovers in Singapore.

He was known in his coaching days as a 'firebrand' and 'fierce coach'.

Death and legacy 
Chow died on 16 July 2018 in Ampang Hospital, Ampang, Selangor, at the age of 75.

References 

1942 births
2018 deaths
Malaysian footballers
Malaysian people of Cantonese descent
Malaysian sportspeople of Chinese descent
Malaysia international footballers
Malaysia national football team managers
Selangor FA players
Malaysian football managers
Malaysian expatriate football managers
Malaysian expatriate sportspeople in Singapore
Expatriate football managers in Singapore
Negeri Sembilan FA players
Sarawak FA managers
Perak F.C. managers
Kuala Lumpur City F.C. managers
Tampines Rovers FC head coaches
Association football midfielders
People from Negeri Sembilan